Dorothy Marie Marsh West (October 11, 1932 – September 4, 1991) was an American country music singer and songwriter. Along with her friends and fellow recording artists Patsy Cline and Loretta Lynn, she is considered one of the genre's most influential and groundbreaking female artists. West's career started in the 1960s, with her top-10 hit, "Here Comes My Baby Back Again", which won her a Grammy Award for Best Female Country Vocal Performance in 1965, the first woman in country music to receive a Grammy.

In the early 1970s, West wrote a popular commercial for the Coca-Cola company, titled "Country Sunshine", which reached number two on Billboard's Hot Country Singles in 1973. In the late 1970s, she teamed up with country pop superstar Kenny Rogers for a series of duets that took her career to new highs, earning platinum-selling albums and number-one records for the first time.

Her duet recordings with Rogers, "Every Time Two Fools Collide", "All I Ever Need Is You", and "What Are We Doin' in Love", became country music standards. In the mid-1970s, her image and music underwent a metamorphosis, bringing her to the peak of her popularity as a solo act, and reaching number one on her own for the first time in 1980 with "A Lesson in Leavin'".

In 2018, West was posthumously inducted into the Country Music Hall of Fame.

Early life

Childhood and teen years
Dorothy Marie Marsh was born on October 11, 1932, to Pelina Artha (née Jones; 1915–1970) and William Hollis Marsh (1908–1967) in a community called Frog Pond about 64 miles northeast of Nashville, Tennessee, United States. She was the eldest of 10 children. The family was extremely poor. To help alleviate the financial strain, West's mother opened up a restaurant and young Dottie helped her run it.

Dottie's father Hollis Marsh was an alcoholic who beat and sexually abused her until she was 17, when she reported him to the local sheriff. She testified in court against her father and he was sentenced to 40 years in prison, where he died in 1967.

After living with the sheriff for a short time, she moved to McMinnville with her mother and siblings. She also joined her high-school band, "The Cookskins", where she sang and played guitar. In 1951, she obtained a music scholarship to Tennessee Technological University in Cookeville, Tennessee. There, she met her first husband, steel guitarist Bill West, with whom she had four children, including country music star Shelly West. She continued to use his surname professionally.

Career discovery
After graduation, West moved with her family to Cleveland, Ohio, where she began appearing on the television program Landmark Jamboree, as one half of a country pop vocal duo called the "Kay-Dots" alongside partner Kathy Dee. At the same time, West made numerous trips to Nashville in the hopes of landing a recording deal. In 1959, Bill and she auditioned for producer Don Pierce at Starday, and were offered a recording contract. The singles West cut for the label proved unsuccessful, but she moved to Nashville, Tennessee, two years later, where she and her husband met several aspiring songwriters, including Willie Nelson, Roger Miller, Hank Cochran, and Harlan Howard. West often played hostess to these struggling songwriters, offering them a place to stay and eat. In return, they taught West about the structure of songwriting. During this time, she also became a close friend of Patsy Cline and her husband, Charlie Dick.

Cline became one of West's biggest career inspirations. As West related to Ellis Nassour in the 1980 book Patsy Cline, the greatest advice Cline ever gave her was, "When you're onstage sing to the audience with all of your heart and mean it. Then cast a spell over them. If you can't do it with feeling, then don't." In their early days in Nashville, West and her family often did not have enough to pay the rent or buy the week's groceries, so Cline would hire her to help with her wardrobe, and West's husband Bill to play in her band. Cline even offered to help pay West's rent or buy groceries, when she and Bill were struggling to stay in Nashville.

On March 5, 1963, Cline died in a plane crash along with Cowboy Copas, Hawkshaw Hawkins, and her pilot and manager Randy Hughes on her way home from a benefit at Memorial Hall in Kansas City, a concert West also attended. West had asked Cline to ride with Bill and her in their car, but Cline, anxious to get back home to her children, opted to fly, instead.

In 1963, Jim Reeves recorded a song written by West called "Is This Me", becoming a number-three hit that year. As a result, Reeves helped West secure a recording contract with RCA Victor.

Country music career

1963–1975: Country success

West earned her first top-40 hit in 1963 with "Let Me Off at the Corner", followed a year later by the top-10 duet with Jim Reeves, "Love Is No Excuse". Also in 1964, she auditioned for RCA Victor producer Chet Atkins, the architect of the Nashville sound, who agreed to produce her composition "Here Comes My Baby". The single made West the first female country artist to win a Grammy Award (Best Female Country Vocal Performance), leading to an invitation to join the Grand Ole Opry. "Here Comes My Baby" reached number 10 on Billboard country charts in 1964. After releasing the Here Comes My Baby LP in 1965, West and producer Chet Atkins reunited the following year for Suffer Time, which generated her biggest hit yet in "Would You Hold It Against Me". In 1967, the West/Atkins pairing issued three separate albums: With All My Heart and Soul (featuring the number-eight smash "Paper Mansions"), Dottie West Sings Sacred Ballads, and I'll Help You Forget Her.

During the same period, she also appeared in a pair of films, Second Fiddle to a Steel Guitar and There's a Still on the Hill. She continued to have success as a solo artist during the late 1960s, with such songs as "What's Come Over My Baby" and "Country Girl", which garnered her an offer to write a commercial based on it for Coca-Cola in 1970. The soft drink company liked the result so much, it signed her to a lifetime contract as a jingle writer.

After the 1968 LP Country Girl, West teamed with Don Gibson for a record of duets, Dottie and Don, featuring the number-two hit "Rings of Gold" released in 1969. The album was her last with Atkins, and she followed it in 1970 with two releases, Forever Yours and Country Boy and Country Girl, a collection of pairings with Jimmy Dean. Around the time of Have You Heard Dottie West, released in 1971, she left her husband Bill, and in 1972, married drummer Byron Metcalf, who was 12 years her junior.

In 1973, West provided Coca-Cola with another advertisement, featuring a song called "Country Sunshine". The popularity of the commercial prompted her to release the song as a single, and it became one of her biggest hits, reaching number two on the country chart and number 49 on the pop chart. The ad itself netted a Clio Award for commercial of the year and she became the first country artist ever to win that particular honor. "Country Sunshine" proved to be a solid comeback, as she was nominated for two Grammys for the song, Best Country Song and Best Female Country Vocal Performance a year later.

After the release of House of Love in 1974, West notched a number of top-40 hits, including the top-10 "Last Time I Saw Him", "House of Love", and "Lay Back Lover". Before signing with United Artists Records in 1976, her final RCA album, Carolina Cousins, was released in 1975.

1976–1985: Country pop
In the late 1970s, West's image underwent a major metamorphosis; the woman who had once performed outfitted in conservative gingham dresses, and had originally refused to record Kris Kristofferson's "Help Me Make It Through the Night" because it was "too sexy", began appearing in spandex-sequined Bob Mackie designs with 20 costumes under a $400,000 contract (she had relented in late 1970 and recorded "Help Me Make It Through the Night" on the album Careless Hands, which was released in 1971). As the sexual revolution peaked, so did West's career. Under United Artists, West's material changed from traditional country to up-tempo and slow-tempo Adult Contemporary-styled music. In 1977, West released her first album under United Artists, When It's Just You and Me. The title track peaked at number 19 on the country chart.

In 1977, she was due to record the song "Every Time Two Fools Collide", when Kenny Rogers vocals were added. Released as a duet, the single hit number one, West's first; the duo's 1979 "All I Ever Need Is You" and 1981 "What Are We Doin' in Love" topped the chart. A 1979 duets album, Classics, also proved successful. The duo proved popular enough to be booked in some of the biggest venues in the United States and other countries. In 1978 and 1979, the duo won the Country Music Association's "Vocal Duo of the Year" award.

In 1980, West filed for divorce from Byron Metcalf, citing his drinking and infidelity.

During the 1980s, West continued to generate solo hits, most notably "A Lesson in Leavin'". Her popularity as a featured performer on the Grand Ole Opry endured. "A Lesson in Leavin'" was West's first number-one solo hit. It also peaked at number 73 on the pop charts. A week before "A Lesson in Leavin'" reached the number-one, it was part of a historic top five in country music, when those spots were all held by women. The album that included this song, Special Delivery, included two other top-15 country hits from 1980, "You Pick Me Up (And Put Me Down)" and "Leavin's for Unbelievers". In 1981, West had a pair of back-to-back number-one hits, "Are You Happy Baby" and "What Are We Doin' in Love" with Kenny Rogers. "What Are We Doin' in Love" was West's only top-40 hit on the pop charts, reaching number 14, becoming a major crossover hit in mid-1981. Her 1981 album Wild West was one of her biggest sellers.

As the 1980s progressed, West's popularity began to slip. However, she did introduce herself to younger audiences as she lent her voice to Melissa Raccoon in the film The Raccoons and the Lost Star (1983), a precursor to the later series produced by Kevin Gillis, The Raccoons. West's 1982 album High Time spawned her last top-20 hit, "It's High Time", which reached number 16. The album's other single, "You're Not Easy to Forget", peaked at only number 26. West's next two albums under Liberty Records, Full Circle and New Horizons, were both commercial failures. West's last top-40 hit was "Tulsa Ballroom" (1983). In 1984, West departed from her label and switched to the independent label Permian.

In 1981, West's daughter Shelly also made a career in country music; she is best known for her hit duet with David Frizzell, "You're the Reason God Made Oklahoma", which hit number one that year. As a solo artist, Shelly notched her own number one in 1983 entitled "José Cuervo". During the early and mid-1980s, Shelly achieved several more hits, including top-10 solo hits "Flight 309 to Tennessee" and "Another Motel Memory". After getting married in the late 1980s, Shelly left the music business.

In 1982, West was asked to play the lead role in the stage production of The Best Little Whorehouse in Texas. That summer, she toured for four weeks in the stage production, performing across the country. She had her own float in the Macy's Thanksgiving Day Parade that year. She also posed for a revealing photo in the men's magazine Oui. In 1983, she married her sound man, Al Winters, 22 years her junior. In 1984, she appeared in the play Bring It On Home. In 1986, she made her screen debut in the science-fiction film The Aurora Encounter. In 1984, West released her final studio album, Just Dottie. This album was not very successful; all three of the singles that it contained failed to chart in the top 40. Her last chart hit, "We Know Better Now", reached only number 53 in 1985.

In 1983, West, who was a lifelong active Democrat, performed on the party's syndicated telethon, "Celebrate America".

Personal problems

1989–1990: Financial problems
Although she remained a popular touring act, West's financial problems mounted. West and Winters filed for divorce in 1990, and he sued her for $7,500. By this time, extravagant spending and a string of bad investments had left her nearly broke. In March, her Los Angeles manager sued her for $130,000, and her former manager sued her for $110,295. Furthermore, a local bank foreclosed on her mansion outside of Nashville, and sent West an eviction notice on August 1, 1990. At this time, West owed the IRS $1.3 million and filed for Chapter 11 bankruptcy; she later switched to Chapter 7, which allowed her to liquidate her assets. West's fan-club president, Sandy Orwig, told The Nashville Network in a 1995 interview that according to West, the "IRS would show up at her door anytime of the day or night, taking her possessions. They even separated and took apart her award plaques, throwing half in one box and the other in another."

After a car accident in her Corvette and a public auction of her mansion and possessions, West began making plans for a comeback, including an album of duets and an autobiography. The album was to feature West's friends and fellow artists Kenny Rogers, Roger Miller, Tanya Tucker, and Tammy Wynette. However, the album never materialized. She recorded her last song in July 1991 called "As For Me", a duet with Norwegian country singer Arne Benoni.

Death and legacy

On August 30, 1991, West was scheduled to perform at the Grand Ole Opry. Shortly after she left her apartment at Nashville's Wessex Towers, her car, a Chrysler New Yorker that Rogers had given to her following the loss of her possessions at the IRS auction, stalled in front of the old Belle Meade theater on Harding Road. West's 81-year-old neighbor George Thackston spotted her on the side of the road and offered to drive her to the Opry for her scheduled appearance. Frantic about reaching the Opry on time, West urged Thackston to drive at high speed.

Thackston lost control of his vehicle while traveling through the Opryland exit on Briley Parkway at a speed of 55 miles per hour; the speed limit for the exit ramp was posted as 25 miles per hour. The car left the ramp, went airborne and struck the central divider. Thackston was found to have had a blood-alcohol content of 0.08%. He pled no contest to reckless endangerment and was ordered to complete an alcohol treatment program. West did not believe that she had been as badly injured as had Thackston and insisted that he be treated first. Officers who responded to the scene incorrectly reported that she did not appear to be injured. However, she had suffered severe internal injuries, including a ruptured spleen and a lacerated liver. Her spleen was removed on Friday, and on the following Monday she underwent two more surgeries to stop her liver from bleeding, but these efforts ultimately failed. Doctors said that West knew the extent of her injuries and even visited with Kenny Rogers shortly before her last operation. On September 4, 1991, during her third operation, West died on the operating table at the age of 58.

West's funeral was held at Christ Church on Old Hickory Boulevard with 600 friends and family attendees, including Emmylou Harris, Connie Smith, Johnny and June Carter Cash and Larry Gatlin. West's friend and fellow artist Steve Wariner, whom she had helped move to Nashville as a young artist, sang "Amazing Grace".

A few weeks later, President George H. W. Bush, a longtime fan for whom she had performed at the White House, expressed his condolences at the CMA Awards.

West's hometown of McMinnville, Tennessee dedicated Highway 56 to her memory, naming it the Dottie West Memorial Highway.

A previously planned country music-themed week for the 1991–92 season of the syndicated Family Feud, scheduled to feature Grand Ole Opry stars playing for charity, was dedicated in her memory.

In 1995, actress Michele Lee, with the help of West's daughter Shelly, produced and starred in the CBS television biopic Big Dreams and Broken Hearts: The Dottie West Story. Lee starred with Rogers, wore all of West's original clothes, including her famous Bob Mackie outfits, and sang West's hits. It became one of the most successful television movies in CBS history. That same year, a biography titled Country Sunshine: The Dottie West Story was released, written by Judy Berryhill and Francis Meeker.

In 1999, country music singer Jo Dee Messina covered West's greatest solo hit, "A Lesson in Leavin'", for her album I'm Alright. The song spent seven weeks at number two on the Hot Country Singles & Tracks chart.

In 2000, West was honored at the BMI Golden Voice Awards with the Female Golden Legacy Award. She was only the second woman to win the award; the first was West's friend and mentor Patsy Cline. Her hometown of McMinnville holds a Dottie West Music Festival each year in October. West was ranked number 23 in Country Music Television's 40 Greatest Women of Country Music in 2002.

Discography

Awards and honors

In November 2003, Country Music Television voted West on their special countdown of the 40 Greatest Fashion Statements in Country Music at number 32 for her glittery costumes and tight spandex outfits from the 1980s.

Duet partners

References

Further reading
Oermann, Robert K. (1998). "Dottie West". In The Encyclopedia of Country Music. Paul Kingsbury, Editor. New York: Oxford University Press. p. 578.

External links

 
 
 

1932 births
1991 deaths
American women country singers
American country singer-songwriters
Burials in Tennessee
Grammy Award winners
Grand Ole Opry members
Country Music Hall of Fame inductees
Country musicians from Tennessee
People from McMinnville, Tennessee
Road incident deaths in Tennessee
Starday Records artists
RCA Records Nashville artists
20th-century American singers
Singer-songwriters from Tennessee
Tennessee Democrats
20th-century American women singers
People from Smithville, Tennessee